Virgil M. Getto (June 19, 1924 – November 6, 2014) was an American politician who was a Republican member of the Nevada General Assembly. He served as Minority Leader of the Assembly in 1975. Getto is a member of the Nevada State Assembly Wall of Distinction. A son of Italian immigrants, Getto was a dairy farmer. He was also a member of the National Future Farmers of America in his younger years.

References

1924 births
2014 deaths
Nevada Republicans
People from Fallon, Nevada